Nate Davis may refer to:

Nate Davis (quarterback) (born 1987), American football quarterback
Nate Davis (offensive lineman) (born 1996), American football offensive lineman
Nathan Davis (gridiron football) (born 1974), American football defensive tackle

See also
Nathan Davis (disambiguation)
Nathaniel Davis (disambiguation)